The 1922 Stanley Cup playoffs concluded on March 22 when the National Hockey League (NHL) champion Toronto St. Patricks defeated the Pacific Coast Hockey Association (PCHA) champion Vancouver Millionaires in the final series, three games to two. With the debut of the Western Canada Hockey League (WCHL) at the start of the season, these playoffs marked the first time that the NHL, the PCHA, and the WCHL all competed for the Cup.

Background
The WCHL began play at the start of the 1921–22 season. Soon, it was agreed to alter the Stanley Cup playoffs: The champions of the two Western leagues would compete in a series, with the winner facing the NHL champion in the final round.

After the 1921–22 WCHL regular season concluded, the Calgary Tigers lost to the Regina Capitals in a series to determine second place; both compiled identical 14–10 records. The Capitals then went on to beat the 15–9 first place Edmonton Eskimos in that league's first championship series.

Vancouver finished second overall in the 1921–22 PCHA regular season standings with a 12–12 record. However, they then went on to defeat the 12–11–1 first place Seattle Metropolitans in the PCHA championship series, winning both games by 1–0.

Meanwhile, the 1921–22 NHL season was capped with the 13–10–1 second place St. Patricks defeating the 14–8–2 first place Ottawa Senators, 5 goals to 4, in the two-game total goals NHL championship series.

Semifinal: Vancouver Millionaires defeat Regina Capitals, 5 goals to 2
Each contest in this Vancouver-Regina two-game total goals series was played under different rules. However, the road team prevailed in each match. Game one, played in Vancouver under the PCHA's seven-man rules, saw Dick Irvin score the game-winning goal to give the Capitals a 2–1 victory. Game two was played in Regina under the WCHL's six-man rules, but Millionaires defenceman Art Duncan recorded a hat-trick as he led Vancouver to a 4–0 shutout, and thus clinching the series on March 11 by a combined score of 5–2.

NHL Finals

Final: Toronto St. Patricks defeat Vancouver Millionaires, 3 games to 2

After Vancouver won Game 1, 4–3, Babe Dye scored 4:50 into overtime of Game 2 to give Toronto a 2–1 win. In Game 3, goaltender Hugh Lehman led the Millionaires to a 3–0 shutout. However, the St. Patricks tied the series in Game 4, 6–0, as John Ross Roach became the first rookie goaltender to record a Stanley Cup shutout. Game 5 belonged to Toronto as Dye scored four goals in a 5–1 victory to win the Stanley Cup.

Dye scored 9 out of the St. Patricks' 16 goals, while Roach averaged 1.80 goals against per game.

Cup engravings
Toronto never did engrave their names on the Cup for their 1922 championship. It was only until the trophy was redesigned in 1948 that the words "1922 Toronto St. Pats." was put onto its then-new collar.

See also
1921–22 NHL season
1921–22 PCHA season
1921–22 WCHL season

References

playoffs
Stanley Cup playoffs